Rafał Stroiński (born 17 June 1964) is a Polish football defender. He was a squad member for the 1983 FIFA World Youth Championship.

References

1964 births
Living people
People from Poznań
Polish footballers
Association football defenders
Warta Poznań players
Lech Poznań players
Olimpia Poznań players
Ekstraklasa players
I liga players
Poland youth international footballers